The Touch of Satan is a 1971 American independent horror film directed by Don Henderson and starring Michael Berry and Emby Mellay in their debut roles. The film was shot between 1968 and 1970 in the Santa Ynez, California area and featured early work by movie makeup artist Joe Blasco, cinematographer Jordan Cronenweth, and composer Robert O. Ragland. The film was relatively obscure, playing only in drive-in theaters and dollar movie houses until a 1998 appearance on the series Mystery Science Theater 3000.

Plot
A farmer is murdered by an elderly insane woman with a burned face. After stabbing the farmer and accidentally setting his barn on fire, the woman stumbles home to her family. The family, an older couple and a young woman, argue about the best way to handle the situation and make vague references that the elderly woman may have killed people in the past.

The scene then switches to the main character, a young man named Jodie who is on an open-ended car trip across America to find himself and discover whether or not he wishes to follow in his father's footsteps as a lawyer. Jodie stops at a small pond to have lunch and meets Melissa, the teenage girl from the previous scene. They banter briefly and she convinces him to come visit her family on their walnut farm, despite the intense distress this offer causes her parents. The young couple grows increasingly close, despite the frightening presence of the elderly woman and various clues dropped along the way that Melissa is, in fact, a 127-year-old witch and the birth sister of the elderly insane woman, whom she has referred to Jodie as being her great-grandmother.

When the old woman murders a deputy policeman in front of Jodie, Melissa confesses that she is a cursed witch and is possessed by Satan. Jodie refuses to believe this, so Melissa reveals in a dream-sequence that her sister was burned as a witch by an angry mob of villagers in the 19th century. Melissa was so distressed by the sight of her sister being burned at the stake that she offered her soul to Satan in order to gain the power to save her. Satan agreed and allowed Melissa to save her sister. Melissa was given eternal life and youth as a result of this bargain, but the gift was a curse as she watched her now-insane sister grow old and homicidal.

The old woman tries to kill Jodie, but Melissa uses her powers to stop her and her sister dies in a fire that she started.  Jodie eventually believes Melissa and has sex with her, effectively "freeing" her from Satan. Unexpectedly, however, she instantly ages to her "actual" age, and Jodie must sell his soul to Satan in order to restore Melissa's youth and save her life. The movie ends with the realization that each are bound to Satan and that Melissa's attempt to save herself has only managed to draw Jodie into the evil contract as well.

Cast

Production
The original title for the film was "Touch of Melissa." Joe Blasco did the make-up effects for the movie, his first feature.

The cinematography was done by Jordan Cronenweth who would later work on the 1982 cult film Blade Runner.

Reception and legacy
The Monster Timess Larry Brill found it to be "interesting and effective."

The film was featured in episode eight, season nine of the movie-mocking show Mystery Science Theater 3000. The episode makes frequent references to dialogue gaffes in the film, such as Jodie referring to the Strickland family farm as a "walnut ranch" and Melissa pointing out that the pond is "where the fish lives."

See also
 List of American films of 1971
 Hallmark Hall of Fame-referenced on the episode
 "Amazing Grace"

References

External links
 
 
 MST3K version on official YouTube channel

1971 films
1971 horror films
American supernatural horror films
The Devil in film
Films about witchcraft
Films scored by Robert O. Ragland
1970s rediscovered films
Rediscovered American films
1970s English-language films
1970s American films
Films set in the 19th century